Viva Zapata! is a 1952 American Western film directed by Elia Kazan and starring Marlon Brando. The screenplay was written by John Steinbeck, using Edgcomb Pinchon's 1941 book Zapata the Unconquerable as a guide. The cast includes Jean Peters, and in an Academy Award-winning performance, Anthony Quinn.

The film is a fictionalized account of the life of Mexican revolutionary Emiliano Zapata from his peasant upbringing through his rise to power in the early 1900s and his death in 1919.

To make the film as authentic as possible, Kazan and producer Darryl F. Zanuck studied the numerous photographs that were taken during the revolutionary years, the period between 1909 and 1919, when Zapata led the fight to restore land taken from common people during the dictatorship of Porfirio Díaz.

Kazan was especially impressed with the Agustín Casasola collection of photographs, and he attempted to duplicate their visual style in the film. Kazan also acknowledged the influence of Roberto Rossellini's Paisan (1946).

Plot
Emiliano Zapata is part of a delegation sent to complain about injustices to corrupt longtime president Porfirio Díaz, but Díaz dismisses their concerns, driving Zapata to open rebellion, along with his brother Eufemio. He unites with Pancho Villa under the leadership of naive reformer Francisco Madero.

Díaz is finally toppled and Madero takes his place, but Zapata is dismayed to find that nothing is changing. Madero offers Zapata land of his own while failing to take action to distribute land to the campesinos who fought to end the dictatorship and break up the estates of the elites. Zapata rejects the offer and seeks no personal gain. Meanwhile, the ineffectual but well-meaning Madero puts his trust in treacherous general Victoriano Huerta. Huerta first takes Madero captive and then has him murdered.

As it becomes clear that each new regime is no less corrupt and self-serving than the one it replaced, Zapata remains guided by his desire to return to the peasants their recently robbed lands while forsaking his personal interests. His brother sets himself up as a petty dictator, taking what he wants without regard for the law, but Zapata remains a rebel leader of high integrity. Although he is able to defeat Huerta after Madero's assassination, as a result of his integrity, Zapata loses his brother and his position.

Although in the end Zapata himself is lured into an ambush and killed, the film suggests that the resistance of the campesinos does not end. Rumors begin that Zapata never died, but is instead continuing to fight from the hills, feeding the campesinos a sense of hope. As several scenes suggest, over the years, the campesinos have learned to lead themselves rather than looking to others to lead them.

Cast
 Marlon Brando as Emiliano Zapata
 Jean Peters as Josefa Zapata, his wife
 Anthony Quinn as Eufemio Zapata
 Joseph Wiseman as Fernando Aguirre
 Arnold Moss as Don Nacio
 Alan Reed as Pancho Villa
 Margo as Soldadera
 Harold Gordon as Francisco Ignacio Madero
 Lou Gilbert as Pablo
 Frank Silvera as Victoriano Huerta
 Florenz Ames as Señor Espejo
 Richard Garrick as Old General
 Fay Roope as Porfirio Díaz
 Mildred Dunnock as Señora Espejo
 Henry Silva as Hernández, the peasant who challenges "President" Zapata (uncredited)
 Ross Bagdasarian as officer (uncredited)

Production

Filming and casting
Filming took place in locations including Durango, Colorado, Roma, Texas, San Ygnacio, Texas in Zapata County, and New Mexico.

The screenplay was written by John Steinbeck based on Edgcomb Pinchon's 1941 book Zapata the Unconquerable. Steinbeck's screenplay has been published as a book along with a narrative of Zapata's life that Steinbeck also wrote.

The film tends to romanticize Zapata and in doing so may distort the true nature of the Mexican Revolution. Zapata fought to free the land for the peasants of Morelos and the other southern Mexican states. The film inaccurately portrays Zapata as illiterate, but he was raised in a family with land and money, and he received an education.

Barbara Leaming writes in her biography of Marilyn Monroe that Monroe tried to obtain a part in the film, but failed, presumably because of Darryl F. Zanuck's lack of faith in her ability, both as an actress and as a box-office draw.

Reception
Viva Zapata! received generally positive reviews from critics. Review aggregator Rotten Tomatoes reports that of 18 reviews, 61% of critics have given the film a positive review, with a rating average of 6.2/10.

Bosley Crowther of The New York Times wrote a highly favorable review and commented that the film "... throbs with a rare vitality, and a masterful picture of a nation in revolutionary torment has been got by Director Elia Kazan." Variety, however, criticized the direction and script: "Elia Kazan's direction strives for a personal intimacy but neither he nor the John Steinbeck scripting achieves in enough measure."

Senator John McCain listed Viva Zapata! as his favorite film of all time.

Awards and nominations

Honors
The film is recognized by American Film Institute in these lists:
 2005: AFI's 100 Years of Film Scores – Nominated

References

External links

 
 
 
 
 
 Viva Zapata detailed description of the plot
 

1952 films
Films with screenplays by John Steinbeck
1950s biographical films
20th Century Fox films
1952 Western (genre) films
American Western (genre) films
American biographical films
Biographical films about rebels
American black-and-white films
1950s English-language films
Films scored by Alex North
Films about Pancho Villa
Cultural depictions of Porfirio Díaz
Films directed by Elia Kazan
Films featuring a Best Supporting Actor Academy Award-winning performance
Films shot in Colorado
Films produced by Darryl F. Zanuck
Films about Emiliano Zapata
Hispanic and Latino American films
Hispanic and Latino American drama films
Hispanic and Latino American action films
Films about coups d'état
1950s American films